Isotrias cuencana is a species of moth of the family Tortricidae. It is found in Spain.

The wingspan is about 15 mm.

References

Moths described in 1899
Polyorthini